KARR (1460 kHz) is an AM radio station licensed to Kirkland, Washington, United States. It airs a Christian radio format and broadcasts to the Seattle metropolitan area. It is owned by James A Dalke and is an affiliate of the Family Radio Network, based in Oakland, California. KARR airs several Christian ministry broadcasts from noted teachers such as RC Sproul, Alistair Begg, Ken Ham, John F. MacArthur, Adriel Sanchez, Dennis Rainey, John Piper, & others as well as traditional and modern hymns & songs by Keith & Kristyn Getty, The Master's Chorale, Fernando Ortega, Chris Rice, Shane & Shane, Sovereign Grace Music, Sara Groves, & multiple other Christian and Gospel music artists.

KARR uses a directional antenna at all times, broadcasting at 5,000 watts by day and 2,500 watts at night. Its transmitter is off 127th Place NE in Kirkland.

History
The 1460 frequency in the Seattle area first was used by KYAC, which signed on in 1964. It was owned by Carl-Dek, Inc. and aired a country music format, and would later flip to an R&B format.  The station was a daytimer, broadcasting at 5,000 watts but required to go off the air at sunset to avoid interfering with other stations on AM 1460. In 1975, KYAC moved to 1250 AM.

Also in 1975, a new station signed on at AM 1460.  KILO aired an album rock format. In 1977, it became KGAA, a country music station owned by Monroe Broadcasting, a Spokane-based company that also owned that city's country station, KGA.

In 1979, KGAA flipped to an MOR format. The station was sold that year to Community Communications of Gresham, Oregon. In 1983, the station was granted the right to broadcast full-time by the Federal Communications Commission (FCC).

The station changed its call sign to KARR in 1984, and flipped to an adult standards format, utilizing the "Music of Your Life" network feed.

In 1985, KARR went dark due to financial problems.  The following September, KARR returned to the air as an affiliate of Family Radio, and would be owned Family Radio itself.

On February 12, 2014, Family Radio announced that KARR would suspend operations on 28 February due to the expiration of the lease at its transmitter location. KARR returned to the air with reduced power from a temporary transmitter site on 23 February 2015.

Effective August 6, 2015, the station was sold to James A. Dalke, for a price of $3,000. Dalke has continued to operate KAAR with oldies programming, restoring it to 250 watts, and adding an FM translator in Redmond. An application has been filed to move the translator to Seattle.

References

External links

ARR
ARR
Kirkland, Washington
Family Radio stations
Radio stations established in 1965